The gens Stellia was an obscure plebeian family at ancient Rome.  No members of this gens are mentioned in history, but a few are known from inscriptions.

Origin
The nomen Stellius is derived from the Latin Stella, a star, which sometimes appears as a cognomen, in its original form, or in the derivative form Stellio.  It belongs to a large class of gentilicia derived from the names of familiar objects.

Members

 Stellia Agathe, dedicated a tomb at Casinum in Latium for her husband, Cornelius Phoebus.
 Stellius Novellus Amaranthus, dedicated a tomb at Messana in Sicilia for his son, Cytisus, aged ten.
 Gaius Stellius C. f. Primigenius, dedicated a tomb at Saepinum in Samnium for his friend, Gaius Neratius Primio.
 Quintus Stellius Q. f. Vopiscus, made an offering to Diana Lucifera at Philippi in Macedonia, dating between the first and third centuries.

See also
 List of Roman gentes

References

Bibliography
 Titus Livius (Livy), History of Rome.
 Publius Papinius Statius, Silvae.
 Marcus Valerius Martialis (Martial), Epigrammata (Epigrams).
 Publius Cornelius Tacitus, Annales.
 Theodor Mommsen et alii, Corpus Inscriptionum Latinarum (The Body of Latin Inscriptions, abbreviated CIL), Berlin-Brandenburgische Akademie der Wissenschaften (1853–present).
 René Cagnat et alii, L'Année épigraphique (The Year in Epigraphy, abbreviated AE), Presses Universitaires de France (1888–present).
 George Davis Chase, "The Origin of Roman Praenomina", in Harvard Studies in Classical Philology, vol. VIII, pp. 103–184 (1897).
 D.P. Simpson, Cassell's Latin and English Dictionary, Macmillan Publishing Company, New York (1963).
 Irma Bitto, Le Iscrizioni Greche e Latine di Messina (The Greek and Latin Inscriptions of Messina), Università degli Studi di Messina (2001).

Roman gentes